The East Rapti River flows from east to west through the Chitwan Valley in Nepal, forming the northern border of the Chitwan National Park. It joins the Narayani River inside the protected area.

See also
Karra River
Kushmanda Sarowar Triveni Dham
Rapti River
Narayani River

References

Rivers of Bagmati Province
Terai-Duar savanna and grasslands
Chitwan District
Makwanpur District
Nawalpur District
Rivers of Gandaki Province